Wauconda Township is a township in Lake County, Illinois, USA.  As of the 2020 census, its population was 23,628.

Geography
Lakes in this township include Bangs Lake and Slocum Lake. The stream of Mutton Creek runs through this township.

Cities and towns
 Port Barrington (southwest corner)
 Island Lake (east half)
 Lake Barrington (south edge)
 Lakemoor (north edge)
 Volo (north edge)
 Wauconda (southeast corner)

Adjacent townships
 Grant Township (north)
 Avon Township (northeast)
 Fremont Township (east)
 Ela Township (southeast)
 Cuba Township (south)
 Algonquin Township, McHenry County (southwest)
 Nunda Township, McHenry County (west)
 McHenry Township, McHenry County (northwest)

Cemeteries
The township contains six cemeteries: Fisher Family (historic) west of Volo; Hope Grove (historic) east of Volo; Saint Peter Catholic in Volo; Slocum Family (historic) west of Wauconda; Volo (historic) in Volo; and Wauconda in Wauconda.

Major highways
 U.S. Route 12
 Illinois State Route 59
 Illinois State Route 60
 Illinois State Route 120
 Illinois State Route 176

Airports and landing strips
 Oak Knoll Farm Airport

Demographics

References
 U.S. Board on Geographic Names (GNIS)
 United States Census Bureau cartographic boundary files

External links
 Wauconda Township official website
 US-Counties.com
 City-Data.com
 US Census
 Illinois State Archives

Townships in Lake County, Illinois
Townships in Illinois